The Eastern Conference is one of two conferences in the Kontinental Hockey League (KHL). Its counterpart is the Western Conference.

Divisions

Eastern Conference Cup winners

Notes
1. 2020 Gagarin Cup playoffs were cancelled due to the COVID-19 pandemic

References

See also
Kontinental Hockey League team changes

 
Kontinental Hockey League divisions